Dakshinavarti shankha, also referred to as Valampuri shankhu and Sri Lakshmi shankha is a sacred Hindu conch. It refers to the shell of a large sea snail from the Indian Ocean (a shell of the species Turbinella pyrum), but one that has a rare reverse-turning spiral. 

The shankha is held with the spout (siphonal canal) pointed up; its spiral twists rightwards rather than the more common form, which twists leftwards.

Terminology 

In scientific usage a dextral (right) shell has the opening on the right, when viewed with the spire . The opposite is sinistral (left). This is consistent with the terms for right-handed screws in engineering and physics. Most species of sea snail are dextral. Within a typically-dextral species, rare individuals may develop sinistral coiling.

In this orientation, a common dextral shell has its opening on the left.

It is rendered  in Sanskrit,  in Hindi, and shankhu in Tamil.

Authenticity 

The true Lakshmi shankha is a rare sinistral Turbinella conch shell from the Indian Ocean, usually from Turbinella pyrum.

Other right-turning sea snail shells are often mistakenly sold and worshiped in place of the genuine shankha. One common substitution is the lightning whelk (Sinistrofulgur perversum, previously named Busycon perversum) from the Atlantic coast of North America. The real shankha has 3 to 7 ridges or plaits on its columella, whereas whelk shells have no such plaits.

The so-called "flower-bud opening test", and the "rice pulling test" (Valampuri said to rise up through a rice heap) are non scientific. The best authenticity test is to take an X-ray image of the Valampuri. Valampuries show some morphological variation depending on origin, and shells with mixed characters of two adjacent localities are seen.

In South India, people trust only the Rameshwaram type of Valampuries, and do not trust other varieties from the West Coast and Bay of Bengal, though these are also true Valampuries.

In South India, people specifically worship 'Gauri Valampuri'. This Valampuri shows small dark spots on its body whorl, near the conch cavity. These dots are of conch skin i.e. of periostrachum in the form of small dark coloured pustules firmly attached in very small ditch or cavities, and difficult to remove. In case such periostrachum pustules are removed, dark coloured spots still appear on the conch body. The Gauri Type (with periostrachum spots) of Valampuri is rare and is more expensive than other types.

Origin 
Genuine Dakshinavarti Lakshmi Conches are only found in the Indian Ocean, between Myanmar (Burma) and Sri Lanka. The three main localities - near Rama Setu, Sri Lanka, and Ramishwaram to Tuticorin (rare); the Arabian Sea; and the Bay of Bengal. Shells from each locality show distinct morphological variations, although varieties showing mixed characters have been observed. 

The main imitation (lightning whelks) mostly come from Florida and the Gulf of Mexico. This imitation is known as African Valampuri. Other than Busyconid species, few other species showing presence of folds in the cavity are wrongly mentioned as Dakshinavarti. These shells, though sinistral and possessing folds, are from other species.

Rarity 

Varieties of Valampuri shells are defined by their locality. The three main localities are Rameshwar, Ram Setu, and Sri Lanka. The second is West Coast of India or Arabian Sea and the third is Bay of Bengal. All three types show variation.

Real Lakshmi Conch (right side spinning) are estimated to occur once per 100,000 conch shells. The shell of the lightning whelk almost always opens on the right (when viewed with the siphonal canal pointing upwards). Valampuries with five plaits or folds in its cavity are known as 'Panchajanya' and are rare. 

Most of the Indian Valampuries show presence of orange coloured inner lip. Valampuries with Orange Brown innerlip and with Orange coloured stripes on the main body whorl are also seen. Completely milky-white Valampuries are rare and expensive. Gauri Valampuries showing presence of dark brown or black periostrachum (conch skin) spots near its cavity on main body whorl look beautiful and are rare and expensive. Giant Valampuries more than 10 kg are extremely rare. Valampuries more than 3 feet and many freak types in Dakshinsvarti have been reported.

Beliefs 
The Lakshmi Conch is said to bring all manner of blessings, particularly material wealth. Ritual use may include bathing deities, drinking from the conch, or the use of mantras oriented to goddess Lakshmi. It is a wonderful object for Vastu offering high positive energy. It is believed to bring power, and mental and physical prosperity on the inner and external world. It also heals relationships, make them healthier.

See also 
 Conch
 Melo melo
 Shankha

References 

Gastropods and humans
Hindu symbols
Commercial molluscs
Turbinellidae
Symbols of Indian religions